Eduard (Edi) Peter Frauneder (born 1977) is an Austrian chef known for his promotion of Austrian cuisine in New York City. He owned restaurant in neighbourhoods (FiDi, Noho, East Village, Midtown) in New York City. He earned his first Michelin Star in 2010 and became "one of the world's youngest Michelin Starred chefs".

Early life 
Eduard (Edi) Frauneder was born in Vienna, Austria in 1977 to Maria and Eduard Frauneder. He grew up in the bakery/pastry shop of his parents where he worked with his father. The elder Frauneder was the second generation owner of Backerei Frauneder in Vienna. Frauneder trained as a baker and pastry chef in the family business before attending culinary school in Vienna at Gastgewerbefachschule Wien am Judenplatz.

Career 
At the age of 19 Frauneder moved to London where he worked as the personal chef to the Austrian Ambassador. In 2001, he moved to New York where he became the personal chef to the German Ambassador to the United Nations. He opened four restaurants in New York City (Seasonal, Edi and The Wolf, Bar Freud, Schilling) and bar The Third Man.

Restaurants 

 Seäsonal - New York -   Austrian traditional cuisine with business partner and chef Wolfgang Ban.  Earned a Michelin Star in 2010. Seäsonal was named one of New York Magazines “Best New Restaurants” of 2010.
 Edi and the Wolf - East Village, New York, a rustic "Austrian tavern"
 The Third Man  - New York - The bar's name was inspired by the 1949 film noir set in Vienna.
 Freud - Noho - Contemporary Austrian cuisine. Later renamed Bar Freud. 
 Schilling  - FiDi - Mediterranean take on Austrian cuisine.
 Vienna Calling fine catering - New York - Austrian-inspired Catering

Personal life 
In 2017 Frauneder married Dr. Tracy-Ann Moo, a breast surgical oncologist. They have 2 children Eduard and Vienna. Frauneder is an avid Kite surfer.

Awards and honors 
Awards

 2018 -Goldene Cloche, Austrian trade commission for his promotion of Austria cuisine abroad.

Media honors

 2010 - Michelin Star for the restaurant Seasonal
 2012- Winner, Iron Chef America
 2014- Winner, Knife Fight, third season

Television credits

References 

1977 births
Living people
Austrian chefs